The Green Party in East Germany was founded in February 1990. At the first free Volkskammer elections it stood with the Independent Women's Association and received 2.0% of the vote. They received 8 seats but could not resolve how to allocate them. The Women's Association pulled out and the Green Party formed a joint parliamentary group with Bündnis 90.

External links
Green Party of the GDR  from Chronik der Wende

References

Defunct green political parties
Green political parties in Germany
Political parties in East Germany
Political parties established in 1990
Political parties disestablished in 1990
1990 establishments in East Germany
1990 disestablishments in East Germany